Alexandru Suciu (born 29 October 1960) is a Romanian former international footballer who played as a midfielder.

International career
Suciu played one friendly game for Romania in 1985 when coach Mircea Lucescu send him on the field in the 46th minute to replace Dorin Mateuț in a match against Poland which ended 0–0.

Honours
Universitatea Cluj
Divizia B: 1984–85
Dinamo București
Cupa României: 1985–86

References

1960 births
Living people
Romanian footballers
Romania under-21 international footballers
Romania international footballers
Association football midfielders
FC Universitatea Cluj players
FC Dinamo București players
BFC Siófok players
Liga I players
Liga II players
Nemzeti Bajnokság I players
Romanian expatriate footballers
Expatriate footballers in Hungary
Romanian expatriate sportspeople in Hungary
Sportspeople from Cluj-Napoca